= Smallhold =

American specialty mushroom company

- Founded: 2017
- Founder: Andrew Carter, Adam DeMartino
- Headquarters: Brooklyn, New York, U.S.
- Area served: New York City, Austin, Los Angeles
- Products: Organic speciality mushrooms
- Website: www.smallhold.com

Smallhold is an American specialty mushroom company based in Brooklyn, New York. Founded in 2017 by Andrew Carter and Adam DeMartino, Smallhold currently operates indoor mushroom farms in New York City, Austin, and Los Angeles. Smallhold produces yellow oyster, blue oyster, lion's mane, maitake, shiitake, and trumpet mushrooms, along with selling kits for customers to cultivate mushrooms at home. In 2023, Smallhold began to produce and sell mushroom pesto. On February 18, 2024, Smallhold filed for Chapter 11 bankruptcy. The company emerged from bankruptcy in September 2024.
